Jonathan Wesley Roberts (born 30 December 1968) is a Welsh former professional footballer who played as a goalkeeper.

Career
Roberts began his career with Cardiff City, progressing through the club's youth system. In November 1987, with the club's two senior goalkeepers Graham Moseley and Alan Judge unavailable, he made his senior debut in an FA Cup match against Peterborough United. After featuring in a Welsh Cup match against Ebbw Vale, Roberts made his league debut in a 2–1 victory over Newport County. He remained with the club until 1989, making nine league appearances before being released.

He signed for Barry Town following his release, where he spent four seasons as the club's first choice goalkeeper and made over 150 appearances. He later played in the Welsh Premier League for Inter Cabletel, Barry Town and Llanelli.

References

1968 births
Living people
Welsh footballers
Cardiff City F.C. players
Barry Town United F.C. players
Cardiff Metropolitan University F.C. players
Llanelli Town A.F.C. players
English Football League players
Cymru Premier players
Association football goalkeepers
Footballers from Pontypridd